Dasia johnsinghi, also known as the barred tree skink, is a species of skink endemic to India. It is currently known from the southern Western Ghats in Tamil Nadu.

References

johnsinghi
Reptiles of India
Endemic fauna of the Western Ghats
Reptiles described in 2012
Taxa named by Surendran Harikrishnan
Taxa named by Karthikeyan Vasudevan
Taxa named by Anslem de Silva
Taxa named by Niladri Bhusan Kar
Taxa named by Rohit Naniwadekar
Taxa named by Albert Lalremruata
Taxa named by K. Rebekah Prasoona
Taxa named by Ramesh K. Aggarwal